Charlene Evelyn Dolly Warren-Peu (born 9 June 1979) is a Pitcairnese politician, who served as Mayor of the Pitcairn Islands from January 2020 to December 2022. She had previously served as Deputy Mayor from 2016 to 2019 and Member of the Island Council from 2014 to 2015.

Warren-Peu was the first woman to lead the country on a permanent basis.

Biography
Warren-Peu was born on Pitcairn to Carol and Jay Warren, and is an eighth-generation descendant of the Bounty mutineers that originally settled Pitcairn. Her mother was jointly one of the first women to sit on the Island Council, while her father was Magistrate of Pitcairn in 1991 and mayor from 2005 to 2007. Warren-Peu runs the island post office, manages a homestay for visitors, and produces honey with her husband Vaine Warren-Peu, a Cook Islander. The couple have five children.

Warren-Peu was elected to the Island Council in 2013. She was elected Deputy Mayor in 2015 and re-elected to the post in 2017. In the 2019 general elections, she was elected mayor.

References

1979 births
Living people
Mayors of the Pitcairn Islands
Members of the Island Council of the Pitcairn Islands
Pitcairn Islands women in politics